The South African Railways Class GE 2-8-2+2-8-2 of 1925 was an articulated steam locomotive.

Between 1925 and 1931, the South African Railways placed eighteen Class GE Garratt articulated locomotives with a  Double Mikado type wheel arrangement in service. They were built in three batches over six years.

Manufacturer
In 1924, specifications were prepared by Colonel F.R. Collins DSO, Chief Mechanical Engineer of the South African Railways (SAR), for the Class GE  Double Mikado type Garratt locomotive. An order was placed with Beyer, Peacock and Company (BP) for the design and construction of six locomotives. They were delivered during March 1925, numbered in the range from 2260 to 2265 and erected in the Salvokop workshops in Pretoria. The Class GE was the only purebred Garratt Double Mikado type to see service on the SAR.

The locomotives proved to be most successful and a second order for ten engines was placed with BP in 1926. These were placed in traffic during November of that year, numbered in the range from 2266 to 2275.

A third order for two locomotives, also from BP, followed in 1930, numbered 2276 and 2277 and placed in service in February 1931.

Characteristics
The Class GE Garratt was designed as a heavy goods locomotive for use on light  rail. It was an enlarged version of the Class GD  Double Prairie type. The Class GE were the first eight-coupled Garratts to be built for the SAR and at the time of their introduction, they were the most powerful locomotives in respect of tractive effort operating on light track in Africa and the Southern Hemisphere.

Their piston valves were actuated by Walschaerts valve gear, controlled by steam reversing gear. As delivered, they had  diameter coupled wheels which were later retyred to  diameter. They had a water-filling tube hole on the front tank only since the front and rear tanks were connected by leveling pipes in accordance with the usual Garratt practice. The locomotives were delivered with mechanical lubricators, but these were later removed.

The locomotives of the three orders were visually distinguishable from one another. The first two orders were mechanically identical, but the second batch had redesigned water tanks with rounded top corners and inset tops on their coal bunkers to improve rearward vision for the crew. They also had slightly smaller firebox and superheater heating areas than the engines of the first batch.

The two locomotives of the third batch were similar in general appearance to those of the second batch, but were  lighter than the engines of the first two batches. They had arch tubes added in the firebox, wider cabs and  larger bore cylinders which made them more powerful. Their engine units had a  longer wheelbase.

Service
They were placed in service working goods traffic on the light rail sections between Zeerust and Mafeking and between Pretoria and Pietersburg. Some were later allocated to the Natal North Coast, shedded at Stanger and Empangeni and employed on freight traffic. In 1972, no. 2262 was the last steam locomotive to undergo a complete overhaul at the Durban Mechanical Workshops.

A few were used for a brief period to work across the Montagu Pass between George and Oudtshoorn. Their final duties were on the Nkwalini branch in Natal, where the last survivors of the original eighteen locomotives were finally replaced by Class GEA and Class GO Garratts. The last ten Class GE locomotives were withdrawn from service in April 1975.

Knuckle couplers
From 1927, the SAR began to convert the couplers of its Cape Gauge rolling stock from the Johnston link-and-pin coupling system, which had been in use since the establishment of the Cape Government Railways in 1873, to AAR knuckle couplers. Conversion of all rolling stock was to take three decades and both coupler types could still be seen on rolling stock into the late 1950s.

Of the locomotives depicted, no. 2269 has the older Johnston link-and-pin type couplers. The coupler on no. 2274 is one of the transition period knuckle couplers with a horizontal gap and a vertical hole in the knuckle itself to accommodate, respectively, a link and a pin to enable the locomotive to couple to rolling stock which was still equipped with the older link-and-pin type couplers.

Preservation
Of the Class 5B ,one survived into preservation. By 2018

Preservation

The week of 19 September 2017, surviving locomotive no. 2260, last used in the early 1970s, was moved from Millsite to Bloemfontein for preservation as part of the THF "A list".

References

2410
Beyer, Peacock locomotives
2-8-2+2-8-2 locomotives
1D1+1D1 locomotives
Garratt locomotives
Cape gauge railway locomotives
Railway locomotives introduced in 1925
1925 in South Africa
Scrapped locomotives